Primera División de México (Mexican First Division) Verano 2002 was the 2002 edition of the Primera División de México, crowning Mexico's spring champion in football. América won the championship for the ninth time in its history and thus qualified for the CONCACAF Champions' Cup 2003, ending a decade-long trophy-less drought.

Overview

Moves
Veracruz bought the place of Irapuato.

Final standings (groups)

League table

Results

Top goalscorers 
Players sorted first by goals scored, then by last name. Only regular season goals listed.

Source: MedioTiempo

Playoffs

Repechage

Morelia won 5–3 on aggregate.

3–3 on aggregate. Santos Laguna advanced for being the higher seeded team..

Bracket

Quarterfinals

3–3 on aggregate. Santos Laguna advanced for being the higher seeded team.

Necaxa won 3–0 on aggregate.

UNAM won 4–1 on aggregate.

América won 6–2 on aggregate.

Semifinals

Necaxa won 1–0 on aggregate.

América won 2–1 on aggregate.

Finals

América won 3–2 on aggregate.

Relegation

Relegation table

Relegation playoff
The Mexican Football Federation decided to increase the number of teams in the Primera División to 20 participants, so it was decided to play a promotion series between León, the last place in the Primera División relegation table, and Veracruz, Primera 'A' season runner-up. Finally, Veracruz was the winner, and the team was promoted to Primera División and León was relegated to Primera 'A'.

Veracruz won 3–1 on aggregate.

After Veracruz Team in Primera A won the promotion, there was already two teams in Veracruz with the same name, for that reason, the owners decided to transfer the team promoted to Tuxtla Gutiérrez, where it was renamed as Jaguares de Chiapas.

References

Mexico
2001–02 in Mexican football
2002A